Destouches is a surname. Notable people with the surname include: 

 André Cardinal Destouches, French composer of Les élémens
 Franz Seraph von Destouches, German composer
 Louis-Camus Destouches, artillery officer and father of Jean le Rond d'Alembert
 Louis-Ferdinand Destouches, better known as Louis-Ferdinand Céline
 Lucette Destouches (1912–2019), French dancer, wife of Céline
 Philippe Néricault Destouches, French dramatist
 Charles René Dominique Sochet, Chevalier Destouches, French admiral

See also
 Claude Desouches (1911–2001), French sailor